Oreste Casalini (9 July 1962 – 19 July 2020) was an Italian painter and sculptor.

References

1962 births
2020 deaths
Artists from Naples
Italian male painters
Italian male sculptors
20th-century Italian painters
21st-century Italian painters
20th-century Italian sculptors
20th-century Italian male artists
21st-century Italian sculptors
21st-century Italian male artists